Government College of Engineering, Nagpur (Marathi:शासकीय अभियांत्रिकी महाविद्यालय,नागपूर) is a college that started in the academic year 2016–17. It is affiliated to the Rashtrasant Tukadoji Maharaj Nagpur University, Nagpur and its mentor institute is Visvesvaraya National Institute of Technology. Its campus is located at New Khapri, Nagpur.

References

Engineering universities and colleges in India
Rashtrasant Tukadoji Maharaj Nagpur University
Educational institutions established in 2016
2016 establishments in Maharashtra